Francesco de Sanctis (Morra Irpina, 28 March 1817 – Naples, 29 December 1883) was a leading Italian literary critic and scholar of Italian language and literature during the 19th century.

Biography
De Sanctis was born in the southern Italian town of Morra Irpina (renamed Morra De Sanctis in his honor in 1937) to a family of middle-class landowners. His father was a doctor in law and his two paternal uncles, one a priest and the other a medic, were exiled for having participated in the Carbonari Uprisings of 1820-1821. After completing his high school studies in nearby Naples, he was educated at the Italian language institute in Naples founded by Marquis Basilio Puoti (1782-1847).

De Sanctis later opened his own private school where he soon became recognized in academic circles for his profound knowledge of Italian literature. In 1848, he held office under the revolutionary government and was later imprisoned for three years in Naples. Following his release, de Sanctis' reputation as a lecturer in Turin on Italian authors such as Dante (c. 1265-1321) led to his professorship in 1856 at ETH Zürich.

De Sanctis returned to Naples as minister of public instruction in 1860, and filled the same post under the Italian monarchy in 1861, 1878 and 1879, having in 1861 become a deputy in the Italian chamber. In 1871, he was made professor of comparative literature at Naples University.

De Sanctis was a supporter of Darwinism, and lectured on the subject.

As a literary critic, De Sanctis was highly regarded, notably with his Storia della letteratura italiana and his critical studies. These were published in several volumes, some of them posthumously, in Naples in 1883.

De Sanctis had many faithful disciples, among whom Benedetto Croce achieved the most fame. His chief contribution as a philosopher was to aesthetics and his influence upon Italian literary criticism remains strong to the present day.

Bibliography

Saggi critici, Rondinella, Napoli 1849
La prigione, Benedetto, Torino 1851
Saggi critici, Morano, Napoli, 1869
Storia della letteratura italiana, Morano, 1870
Un viaggio elettorale, Morano, Napoli 1876
Studio sopra Emilio Zola, Roma, XVI 1878
Nuovi saggi critici, Morano, Napoli, 1879
Zola e l'assommoir, Treves, Milano 1879
Saggio sul Petrarca, Morano, Napoli 1883
Studio su G.Leopardi, a cura di R. Bonari, Morano, Napoli 1885
La giovinezza di Francesco De Sanctis, a cura di Pasquale Villari, Morano, Napoli 1889
Purismo illuminismo storicismo, scritti giovanili e frammenti di scuola, lezioni, a cura di A. Marinari, 3 voll., Einaudi, Torino 1975
La crisi del romanticismo, scritti dal carcere e primi saggi critici, a cura di M. T. Lanza, introd. di G. Nicastro, Einaudi, Torino 1972
Lezioni e saggi su Dante, corsi torinesi, zurighesi e saggi critici, a cura di S. Romagnoli, Einaudi, Torino 1955, 1967
Saggio critico sul Petrarca, a cura di N. Gallo, introduzione di Natalino Sapegno, Einaudi, Torino 1952
Verso il realismo, prolusioni e lezioni zurighesi sulla poesia cavalleresca, frammenti di estetica e saggi di metodo critico, a cura di N. Borsellino, Einaudi, Torino 1965
Storia della letteratura italiana a cura di N. Gallo, introd. di N. Sapegno, 2 voll., Einaudi, Torino 1958
Manzoni, a c. di C. Muscetta e D. Puccini, Einaudi, Torino 1955
La scuola cattolica-liberale e il romanticismo a Napoli, a cura di C. Muscetta e G. Candeloro, Einaudi, Torino 1953
Mazzini e la scuola democratica, a cura degli stessi, Einaudi, Torino 1951, 1961
Leopardi, a cura di C. Muscetta e A. Perna, Einaudi, Torino 1961
L'arte, la scienza e la vita, nuovi saggi critici, conferenze e scritti vari, a c. di M. T. Lanza, Einaudi, Torino 1972
Il Mezzogiorno e lo Stato unitario, scritti e discorsi politici dal 1848 al 1870, a c. di F. Ferri, Einaudi, Torino 1960
I partiti e l'educazione della nuova Italia, a c. di N. Cortese, Einaudi, Torino 1970
Un viaggio elettorale, seguito da discorsi biografici, dal taccuino elettorale e da scritti politici vari, a cura di N. Cortese, Einaudi, Torino 1968
Epistolario (1836-1862) a c. di G. Ferretti, M. Mazzocchi Alemanni e G. Talamo, 4 voll. 1956-69
Lettere a Pasquale Villari, a c. di F. Battaglia, Einaudi, Torino 1955
Lettere politiche (1865-80) a c. di A. Croce e G. B. Gifuni, Ricciardi, Milano-Napoli 1970
Lettere a Teresa, a cura di A. Croce, Ricciardi, Milano-Napoli 1954
Lettere a Virginia, a cura di Benedetto Croce, Laterza, Bari 1917
Mazzini, a cura di Vincenzo Gueglio, Genova, Fratelli Frilli, 2005.

References

Further reading
B. Croce, Gli scritti di Francesco De Sanctis e la loro varia fortuna, Bari 1917
C. Muscetta, nel vol. F. De Sanctis, Pagine sparse, Bari 1944
G. Contini, Varianti e altra linguistica. Una raccolta di saggi (1938-1968), Torino, Einaudi 1970 pp. 499–531 (il saggio è uscito nel 1949 come introduzione a F. De Sanctis, Scritti critici, Torino, Utet).
R. Wellek, Storia della critica moderna, Bologna, Il Mulino, 1969, IV, pp. 123–74 (il saggio originario è del 1956).
M. Fubini, "Francesco De Sanctis e la critica letteraria", in Romanticismo italiano. Saggi di storia della critica e della letteratura, Bari, Laterza, 1971 pp. 295–319 (pubblicato per la prima volta in francese nei Cahiers d'Histoire Mondiale, VII, 1963,2).
R. Wellek, "The critical realism of Francesco De Sanctis", in Comparative Criticism: a Yearbook, vol. 1, Cambridge University Press, 1979  pp. 17–35.
C. Dionisotti, Geografia e storia della letteratura italiana, Torino, Einaudi, 1967 pp. 12–15 e 27-30
C. Muscetta, "'Francesco De Sanctis", in Lett. it. L., VIII/I, pp. 355–462
M. Mirri, Francesco De Sanctis politico e storico della civiltà moderna, Messina-Firenze, D'Anna, 1961
S. Landucci, Cultura e ideologia in Francesco De Sanctis, Milano, Feltrinelli, 1963
C. Muscetta, Francesco De Sanctis nella storia della cultura, Roma-Bari, Laterza, 1958
 T. Iermano, Introduzione a Francesco De Sanctis, Lettere a Teresa, Salerno, Mephite, 2002
 T. Iermano, Introduzione a Francesco De Sanctis, Un viaggio elettorale, Cava de' Tirreni (SA), Mephite, 2007
G. Compagnino, De Sanctis e Pagano, in Francesco De Sanctis un secolo dopo, a c.di A. Marinari, Roma-Bari, Laterza, Vol. I, pp. 69–129.
G. Compagnino,  L'estetica e la "scissura nella cosa": De Sanctisi e Manzoni, in Idem, Forme e Storie, Facoltà di Lettere e Filosofia dell'Università di Catania, <<Quaderni del Siculorum Gymnasium>>, Catania, 2001.
G. Compagnino, Hegel e la genesi del moderno nella Storia del De Sanctis, in Idem, Forme e Storie, Facoltà di Lettere e Filosofia dell'Università di Catania, <<Quaderni del Siculorum Gymnasium>>, Catania, 2001.
G. Compagnino, I primi capitoli della Storia del De Sanctis: oltre la crisi del classicismo, in Idem, Forme e Storie, Facoltà di Lettere e Filosofia dell'Università di Catania, <<Quaderni del Siculorum Gymnasium>>, Catania, 2001.

1817 births
1883 deaths
People from the Province of Avellino
Kingdom of the Two Sicilies people
Politicians of Campania
Action Party (Italy, 1853) politicians
Historical Right politicians
Historical Left politicians
Education ministers of Italy
Deputies of Legislature VIII of the Kingdom of Italy
Deputies of Legislature IX of the Kingdom of Italy
Deputies of Legislature X of the Kingdom of Italy
Deputies of Legislature XI of the Kingdom of Italy
Deputies of Legislature XII of the Kingdom of Italy
Deputies of Legislature XIII of the Kingdom of Italy
Deputies of Legislature XIV of the Kingdom of Italy
Deputies of Legislature XV of the Kingdom of Italy
Italian literary critics
19th-century Italian historians
Italian literary historians
19th-century Italian philosophers
19th-century Italian male writers